Jobs is a 2013 American biographical drama film based on the life of Steve Jobs, from 1974 while a student at Reed College to the introduction of the iPod in 2001. It is directed by Joshua Michael Stern, written by Matt Whiteley, and produced by Stern and Mark Hulme. Steve Jobs is portrayed by Ashton Kutcher, with Josh Gad as Apple Computer's co-founder Steve Wozniak. Jobs was chosen to close the 2013 Sundance Film Festival.

Plot 
The film opens in 2001 with a middle-aged Steve Jobs (Ashton Kutcher) introducing the iPod at an Apple Town Hall meeting.

The story flashes back to Reed College in 1974. The high tuition forces Jobs to drop out, but Dean Jack Dudman (James Woods) allows him to sit in on classes. Jobs is particularly interested in a calligraphy course. Jobs meets up with his friend Daniel Kottke (Lukas Haas), who is excited to see Jobs with a copy of Be Here Now by Baba Ram Dass. Influenced by this book and their experiences with LSD, Jobs and Kottke spend time in India. His philosophical ideas also lead Jobs to the decision not to wear any footwear.

Two years later, Jobs is back in Los Altos, California, living with his adoptive parents Paul (John Getz) and Clara (Lesley Ann Warren). While working for Atari as a video game developer, Jobs develops a partnership with his friend Steve "Woz" Wozniak (Josh Gad). Jobs is charged by his boss Al Alcorn (David Denman) to re-develop an arcade video game (Breakout), which he ends up having Wozniak build in his place. The job is such a success that Alcorn presents it to President Nolan Bushnell, but Jobs inequitably distributes the salary for the game development between Wozniak and himself.

Later, Jobs discovers that Wozniak has built a prototype for a "personal home computer" (the Apple I), which he expresses interest in commercialising. They name their new company Apple Computer, though there is another company called Apple Records that is owned by The Beatles (Wozniak teases Jobs that this symbolizes his preference for Bob Dylan). After a failed sale at his employer company HP, Wozniak reluctantly demonstrates the Apple I at the Homebrew Computer Club to a bored audience. Jobs is later approached by store owner Paul Terrell (Brad William Henke) who shows interest in the Apple I. Jobs persuades his father Paul to let them set up their new company in the family's garage workshop. Jobs also recruits Kottke, fellow engineer Bill Fernandez (Victor Rasuk), and young neighbour Chris Espinosa (Eddie Hassell) to the Apple team.

Terrell's disappointment in the Apple I (in his opinion, being only a motherboard and not a full computer as promised), inspires Jobs to restart with a second model. He hires Rod Holt (Ron Eldard) to re-conceptualize the power supply for what will be called the Apple II. Mike Markkula (Dermot Mulroney), a venture capitalist, notices Jobs and Wozniak's work, and also joins Apple. The Apple II is released at the 1977 West Coast Computer Faire where it is a remarkable success.

Apple's success eventually causes Jobs to distance himself from his friends. Upon learning his high-school girlfriend Chrisann Brennan (Ahna O'Reilly) is pregnant, Jobs ends their relationship. Brennan gives birth to Lisa Brennan whom Jobs denies is his child. Kottke (now an Apple II Plus repairer) meanwhile leaves the company after acknowledging that his friend Jobs (who hardly even has any time to talk to him) is not rewarding the Apple I team with any Apple stock. John Sculley (Matthew Modine) is recruited as CEO of the company. As Jobs' behavior grows more erratic, Jobs is moved from the Apple Lisa development team to the Macintosh Group where he works with Bill Atkinson, Burrell Smith (Lenny Jacobson), Chris Espinosa, and Andy Hertzfeld (Elden Henson). Despite the change, his behavior does not change: he forces out Jef Raskin, the original Macintosh group leader, and then takes his place. Later, he  phones Microsoft founder Bill Gates, legally threatening him because their Word software is, in his opinion, a plagiarism of his team's word processor. Wozniak, still part of the Apple IIe team, decides to leave the company, feeling it has lost its way.

Though the Macintosh is introduced with great fanfare in 1984, including a high-budget television commercial, it is seen as a failure due to the disproportionately high cost (as compared to the competitor IBM's DOS-based PCs). Jobs, convinced that the error is the limited random-access memory of the system, launches a new, more advanced version, but Scully forces him out of the company in 1985.

The film jumps to 1996. Jobs is married to Laurene Powell Jobs (Abby Brammell) and he has accepted Lisa (Annika Bertea) as his daughter (she now lives with them). He has a son, Reed (Paul Baretto) and is also running NeXT. When Apple buys NeXT, then-CEO Gil Amelio asks Jobs to return to Apple as a consultant. Jobs is soon named the new CEO, then fires Amelio and relieves the Board of Directors. Jobs becomes interested in the work of Jony Ive (Giles Matthey), particularly during the design of the iMac and strives to reinvent Apple. The film ends with Jobs recording the dialogue for the Think Different commercial in 1997. Before the credits, there is a photo montage of the main characters paired with film clips of the actor playing the part, plus a dedication to Steve Jobs.

Cast

Apple
 Ashton Kutcher as Steve Jobs
 Josh Gad as Steve Wozniak
 Lukas Haas as Daniel Kottke
 Victor Rasuk as Bill Fernandez
 Eddie Hassell as Chris Espinosa
 Ron Eldard as Rod Holt
 Nelson Franklin as Bill Atkinson
 Elden Henson as Andy Hertzfeld
 Lenny Jacobson as Burrell Smith
 Giles Matthey as Jony Ive
 Dermot Mulroney as Mike Markkula
 Matthew Modine as John Sculley
 J. K. Simmons as Arthur Rock
 Kevin Dunn as Gil Amelio
 Brett Gelman as Jef Raskin

Family
 John Getz as Paul Jobs
 Lesley Ann Warren as Clara Jobs
 Abby Brammell as Laurene Powell Jobs
 Annika Bertea as Lisa Brennan-Jobs (adult)
 Ava Acres as Lisa Brennan (child)
 Ahna O'Reilly as Chrisann Brennan

Other
 James Woods as John "Jack" Dudman
 David Denman as Al Alcorn
 Brad William Henke as Paul Terrell
 Robert Pine as Edgar S. Woolard, Jr.
 Amanda Crew as Julie
Masi Oka as Ken Tanaka

Production

Development

Screenwriter Matt Whiteley began work on the screenplay around the time Steve Jobs took medical leave from Apple to battle pancreatic cancer. Director Joshua Michael Stern stated in an interview that all material for the screenplay was collected via research and interviews:

Mark Hulme, our producer, had an expert team of researchers to comb through all public records and interviews that had anything to do with Steve Jobs. Mark, the screenwriter and the research team, also took it upon themselves to interview quite a large pool of people who either worked at Apple or worked with Steve to make sure we portrayed as accurate a portrait and telling of the events possible within the constraints of the film's length.

Filming
Production began in June 2012 at Jobs' childhood home in Los Altos, California, with the help of Jobs' stepmother, Marilyn Jobs (who still lives there). It was also observed by his sister Patricia. The majority of the film was shot in the Los Angeles region.Russell Carpenter was the cinematographer.

In August 2012, production moved to New Delhi and Vrindavan in order to provide the setting for Jobs' 1974 trek to India. Locations include "Delhi's Jama Masjid, the Hauz Khas Complex, Safdarjung Tomb and Humayun's Tomb." Aseem Bajaj (Bandit Queen, Chameli, and Khoya Khoya Chand) served as cinematographer for scenes shot in India, though cinematographer Russell Carpenter went to India as well. Bajaj notes that they "shot guerrilla style in the crazy and mad by-lanes of Chandni Chowk in Old Delhi. We shot near the Red Fort and the famous Jama Masjid for two full days with multiple cameras spread across everywhere. Ashton stood frozen with the chaos staring right in his face which helped us capture what Steve Jobs must have felt on his visit to India."

Release
The Business Insider described the film's opening as a box-office bomb, earning $6.7 million in its first weekend and placing seventh overall.

It had a worldwide gross of $42.1 million against its $12 million budget, making the film a modest box office success.

Reception
On Rotten Tomatoes, the film holds a 28% rating, based on 133 reviews, with a weighted average of 4.95/10. The website's critical consensus reads, "An ambitious but skin-deep portrait of an influential, complex figure, Jobs often has the feel of an over-sentimentalized made-for-TV biopic." Review aggregator Metacritic gave the film a score of 44 out of 100, based on 35 critics, indicating "mixed or average reviews". Audiences polled by CinemaScore gave the film an average rating of "B−".

E! Online said, "Critics have taken the film to task for a reach that falls far short of its ambition, marred by its superficial and unsatisfying portrait of an icon who deserved better." Forbes reported that the consensus among critics was "mixed positives for Kutcher's performance" and a "thumbs down for Joshua Michael Stern's film."

Robert X. Cringely, author of Accidental Empires and creator of the documentaries Triumph of the Nerds and Steve Jobs: The Lost Interview, argues that "the film is beautifully shot and Kutcher's portrayal of Jobs, while not spot-on, is pretty darned good. He certainly has the look down and the walk. But Ashton Kutcher also produced this film and he's definitely a better actor than producer. There are a lot of historical inaccuracies that just don't have to be there. ... The great failing of this film is the same failing as with Walter Isaacson's book: something happened during Steve's NeXT years (which occupy less than 60 seconds of this 122-minute film) that turned Jobs from a brat into a leader, but they don't bother to cover that." Mick LaSalle of the San Francisco Chronicle states that "at its best, it's a good picture, and at its worst, it's almost good." Peter Travers of Rolling Stone suggests that "Kutcher nails the genius and narcissism. It's a quietly dazzling performance" but also notes that "Jobs is a one-man show that needed to go for broke and doesn't. My guess is that Jobs would give it a swat." Contributor for rogerebert.com, Susan Wloszczyna, gave the movie 2/4 stars, saying that, "Rather than attempting a deeper plunge behind the whys and wherefores of the elite business-model gospel according to Apple Inc. guru Steve Jobs and – more importantly – what it says about our culture, the filmmakers follow the easy rise-fall-rise-again blueprint familiar to anyone who has seen an episode of VH1's Behind the Music." She further discusses how Kutcher's performance and the overall movie failed to portray Jobs in the iconic manner that current pop culture suggests even after Jobs' passing. In a movie review for The New York Times, writer Manohla Dargis writes that Jobs was "inevitably unsatisfying" and a result of a poor performance of the filmmakers rather than the actors themselves.

Historical accuracy
In a January 2013 interview with The Verge, Steve Wozniak notes that he was approached by the crew of Jobs and given an early script to read. He read it as far as he "could stomach it and felt it was crap. The Sony people got in contact with me too and in the end I went with them. You can't do both [films] and be paid." At around the same time, he responded to the first promotional clip for the film on Gizmodo by stating that the "personalities are very wrong, although mine is closer ... our relationship was so different than what was portrayed."

In August 2013, before the wide release of the film, Kutcher responded to these critiques in a few interviews. In an interview with the Associated Press, Kutcher stated:  He reiterated this point in an interview with The Hollywood Reporter by stating that Wozniak "is being paid by another movie studio to help support their Steve Jobs film, so he's gonna have an opinion that is connected to that, somewhat." Wozniak responded to Kutcher's comments as well as to the film itself on Gizmodo by stating that "either film would have paid me to consult, but the Jobs one already had a script written. I can't take that creative leadership from someone else. And I was turned off by the Jobs script. But I still hoped for a great movie." He also believed several individuals portrayed in the film were inaccurately and/or unfairly portrayed including himself and Steve Jobs. Wozniak reiterated these points in an interview with Bloomberg Television adding that he is "really easy to get a hold of, [Kutcher] could have called me and consulted over the phone any time." The Verge noted that "Wozniak was in fact invited to consult on the film, but declined after reading the script, saying he and his wife were 'abhorred' by it. Wozniak was a consultant on Aaron Sorkin's 2015 Steve Jobs film. When asked why he did not at least correct the inaccuracies he saw, Wozniak said, 'I have a very busy life, and it came at a very busy time in my life.'"

In an interview with Slashdot, Daniel Kottke states that he consulted on early versions of the screenplay and notes that "Ashton's very good. I have no complaints with him at all, no complaints with his portrayal of Jobs. The complaint that people would rightly have about the film is that it portrays Woz as not having the same vision as Steve Jobs, which is really unfair." He also said that the early versions of the screenplay "were painful. Really painful. I forwarded the first draft to Mike Markkula because they wanted his feedback, and Mike took such a bad reaction to it, he wouldn't have anything more to do with the project. By the time it got to the fourth draft, it was okay. It wasn't making me cringe." Kottke also outlines various areas that were both accurate and inaccurate in the film. Bill Fernandez was part of the same interview but states that he didn't see the film because "the whole thing is a work of fiction, and I don't want to be upset by all the things that the screenwriter has invented and don't represent the truth." Kottke responded that he didn't think of the film as fiction because "I was involved early on in the film, and they really, sincerely tried to make it as accurate as they could."

In the same interview, Fernandez and Kottke commented on the characterization of Rod Holt (portrayed by actor Ron Eldard). Kottke disputed the characterization, noting that: "What completely cracked us all up is the scene where Rod arrives for the first time. Rod comes up wearing leathers, riding up on a motorcycle with long hair ... he's like this motorcycle dude. It just cracked us all up." Fernandez, who had not seen the film at the time of the interview, was also surprised by this portrayal. Holt, however, (according to Kottke), "thought it was hilarious." As for why he may have been characterized this way, Kottke states that, "Rod was really into dirt bikes. And I never saw him riding one, but he talked about it all the time. So the author just had him riding up on a motorcycle. I liked that guy. I met him on the set. I had no idea who he was when I met him because he doesn't look at all like Rod, he has long straight hair and he's wearing leathers." Fernandez, who was equally amused by this vision of Holt responded by asking, "Who could this possibly be in the Apple universe? ... It seems to me that there's a lot of fan fiction about Apple Computer and about Steve Jobs, and I think that this is the biggest, flashiest piece of fan fiction that there's been to date."

Chris Espinosa stated on Twitter, "FYI My position at Apple precludes my commenting on the #JobsMovie with the press or public. But I can say that I enjoyed watching the film."

The TV show John Wants Answers took Wozniak, Kottke, and Andy Hertzfeld through the film scene by scene and discussed how the events actually occurred.

Original soundtrack 
A number of classic rock, classical music, and contemporary works appeared in the film. The commercial film soundtrack focuses on an original score by John Debney and includes some but not all of the classical and classic rock works.

See also

List of artistic depictions of Steve Jobs

Further reading
Gruman, Galen. "The Steve Jobs story you should see isn't told in 'Jobs': 'Jobs' the movie is worth seeing, but falls short with omission of Steve Jobs's real transformation or later, greater achievements." InfoWorld, August 19, 2013.

References

External links

Official trailer

2013 films
2013 biographical drama films
2013 independent films
American biographical drama films
American business films
American independent films
Films about Steve Jobs
2010s business films
Films set in the 1970s
Films set in 1974
Films set in 1976
Films set in 1977
Films set in the 1980s
Films set in 1980
Films set in 1982
Films set in 1984
Films set in the 1990s
Films set in 1996
Films set in the 2000s
Films set in 2001
Films set in India
Films set in the San Francisco Bay Area
Films shot in California
Films shot in Delhi
Films directed by Joshua Michael Stern
Open Road Films films
Entertainment One films
Films scored by John Debney
Films shot in India
2013 drama films
2010s English-language films
2010s American films
Film controversies
Film controversies in the United States
Political controversies in film